Reeperbahn is a Hamburg S-Bahn station in St. Pauli, Hamburg, Germany, located at the eastern end of the Reeperbahn. Reeperbahn station is part of the City S-Bahn tunnel from Hamburg main station in St. Georg to Hamburg-Altona station in Altona, and opened on 21 April 1979.

Station layout 
The underground station consists of two levels with a mezzanine and a station level with one island platform, two tracks and two exits. At the exit Nobistor is a bus stop and a taxicab stand. The station can also be used as an air-raid shelter. The station is not accessible for handicapped persons, because there is no lift.

Service 
On track 1 the trains in destination Wedel, Pinneberg and Altona and on track 2 the trains in destination Stade, Bergedorf and Poppenbüttel are calling Reeperbahn in the rush hours every 2 to 3 minutes.

References

External links  

 

Hamburg S-Bahn stations in Hamburg
Buildings and structures in Hamburg-Mitte
Railway stations located underground in Hamburg
Railway stations in Germany opened in 1979
1979 establishments in West Germany